Fielder Mountain is a summit in the U.S. state of Oregon. It is located in Jackson Country near the city of Rogue River.

Fielder Mountain was named after Thomas Fielder, a pioneer settler.

References

Mountains of Jackson County, Oregon
Mountains of Oregon